William Jordan was a college football player and coach for the Georgia Tech Yellow Jackets. A prominent end, he was selected All-SEC in 1937. He was a key feature in the defeat of Vanderbilt. Jordan was selected for the All-Alexander era team, and the Tech athletics hall of fame. He later coached the ends for Tech.

References

Georgia Tech Yellow Jackets football players
American football ends
Date of birth missing
Date of death missing
Georgia Tech Yellow Jackets football coaches